Porog is a rural locality (a village) in Semizerye Rural Settlement, Kaduysky District, Vologda Oblast, Russia. The population was 21 as of 2002.

Geography 
Porog is located 72 km northwest of Kaduy (the district's administrative centre) by road. Sosnovka is the nearest rural locality.

References 

Rural localities in Kaduysky District